Wentworth Beaumont may refer to:

Wentworth Beaumont, 1st Baron Allendale (1829–1907), British industrialist and politician
Wentworth Beaumont, 1st Viscount Allendale (1860–1923), British politician
Wentworth Beaumont, 2nd Viscount Allendale (1890–1956), British peer
Wentworth Beaumont, 3rd Viscount Allendale (1922–2002), British peer
Wentworth Beaumont, 4th Viscount Allendale (born 1948), British peer